Michał Jerzy Winiarski (born 28 September 1983) is a Polish professional volleyball coach and former player. He was a member of the Poland national team from 2004 to 2014. A participant in the Olympic Games (Beijing 2008, London 2012), 2014 World Champion, and the 2012 World League winner. He currently serves as head coach for the Germany national team and the Polish PlusLiga team, Aluron CMC Warta Zawiercie.

Personal life
Michał Winiarski was born in Bydgoszcz, Poland. He graduated from the Sports Championship School in Spała. He studied at the Management and Administration College in Opole. On 13 May 2006, he married Dagmara (née Stęplewska). On 28 November 2006, their son Oliwier was born. On 13 March 2014, his wife gave birth to their second son, named Antoni.

Career as a player

Clubs
With AZS Częstochowa, Winiarski is a two–time bronze medallist of the Polish Championship (2004, 2005). He spent the 2005/2006 season  as a player of BOT Skra Bełchatów, and won the Polish Championship and Polish Cup with this team. From 2006 to 2009, he played for Italian team Itas Diatec Trentino. With this team, he won the 2008–09 CEV Champions League, and was also named the Best Blocker of the tournament. He has a gold (2008) and silver (2009) medal from the Italian Championship. In 2009, he returned to PGE Skra Bełchatów. They won the Polish Championship in 2010, and 2011. He has a silver medal at the Club World Championship in 2010. In 2010, PGE Skra Bełchatów, including Winiarski, won a bronze medal of the CEV Champions League. They improved this result in 2012, when they won a silver medal of the CEV Champions League, after a match against Zenit Kazan at the Final Four held in Łódź, Poland. Michał Winiarski was named the Best Receiver of the tournament. In 2013, he signed a 2–year contract with Russian team Fakel Novy Urengoy, but eventually he only spent one season in Russia. On 16 June 2014, it was officially announced that Winiarski is returning to Bełchatów, and had signed a two–year contract with PGE Skra Bełchatów. On 8 October 2014, his team won the Polish SuperCup. On 7 February 2016, he won the Polish Cup after beating ZAKSA in the final. After the 2016–17 PlusLiga season, Winiarski decided to end his volleyball career.

National team
In 2003, he captained the Polish national volleyball team to a gold medal at the U21 World Championship. He debuted as a senior national team player on 7 January 2004, in a match against Russia. In 2006, he took part in the World Championship, where the Polish team finished 2nd. During the course of the Poland–Brazil match for the gold medal, his first son was born. In 2008, he took part in the Olympic Games Beijing 2008, where Poland came in fifth, and Winiarski received an award for the Best Receiver of the tournament. In 2011, he and the rest of his national team, won a silver medal at the World Cup. On 8 July 2012, the Polish national team won a gold medal at the 2012 World League with the final tournament held in Sofia, Bulgaria. In May 2014, Winiarski was chosen as the new captain of the national team, replacing the previous one, Marcin Możdżonek. On 21 September 2014, Poland, with Winiarski as the captain, won a title of the World Champions. On the same day, Winiarski announced his retirement from the national team.

On 27 October 2014, Winiarski received a state award granted by the Polish President, Bronisław Komorowski: the Officer's Cross of Polonia Restituta for outstanding sports achievements and worldwide promotion of Poland.

Honours

As a player
 CEV Champions League
  2008/2009 – with Itas Diates Trentino
  2011/2012 – with PGE Skra Bełchatów
 National championships
 2005/2006  Polish Cup, with BOT Skra Bełchatów
 2005/2006  Polish Championship, with BOT Skra Bełchatów
 2007/2008  Italian Championship, with Itas Diates Trentino
 2009/2010  Polish Championship, with PGE Skra Bełchatów
 2010/2011  Polish Cup, with PGE Skra Bełchatów
 2010/2011  Polish Championship, with PGE Skra Bełchatów
 2011/2012  Polish Cup, with PGE Skra Bełchatów
 2014/2015  Polish SuperCup, with PGE Skra Bełchatów
 2015/2016  Polish Cup, with PGE Skra Bełchatów

Youth national team
 2003  FIVB U21 World Championship

Individual awards
 2006: Polish Cup – Best Server
 2008: Olympic Games – Best Receiver
 2009: CEV Champions League – Best Blocker
 2011: Polish Cup – Best Receiver
 2012: CEV Champions League – Best Receiver
 2012: Polish Cup – Best Receiver

State awards
 2006:  Gold Cross of Merit
 2014:  Officer's Cross of Polonia Restituta

References

External links

 
 Player profile at LegaVolley.it 
 Player profile at PlusLiga.pl 
 
 
 
 Coach/Player profile at Volleybox.net

1983 births
Living people
Sportspeople from Bydgoszcz
Polish men's volleyball players
Polish volleyball coaches
Volleyball coaches of international teams
Polish Champions of men's volleyball
Italian Champions of men's volleyball
Olympic volleyball players of Poland
Volleyball players at the 2008 Summer Olympics
Volleyball players at the 2012 Summer Olympics
Recipients of the Gold Cross of Merit (Poland)
Officers of the Order of Polonia Restituta
Polish expatriate sportspeople in Italy
Expatriate volleyball players in Italy
Polish expatriate sportspeople in Russia
Expatriate volleyball players in Russia
Polish expatriate sportspeople in Germany
AZS Częstochowa players
Skra Bełchatów players
Trentino Volley players
Trefl Gdańsk coaches
Warta Zawiercie coaches
Outside hitters